Anupam (in Devanagari : अनुपम) is an Indian masculine given name, whose meaning in Sanskrit is "incomparable", "excellent".

Notable people named Anupam 
 Anupam Amod, Indian playback singer
 Anupam Bhattacharya, Indian television actor
 Anupam Dutta, Indian music director and composer
 Anupam Garg, Indian-American physicist
 Anupam Gupta (born 1954), Indian lawyer
 Anupam Hayat, Bangladeshi film critic
 Anupam Hazra (born 1982), Indian educator and member of parliament
 Anupam Joshi, Professor and Cybersecurity expert 
 Anupam Kher (born 1955), Indian actor
 Anupam Mazumdar, theoretical physicist
 Anupam Mishra (born 1948), Indian author and environmentalist
 Anupam Nath (born 1971), Indian photo journalist
 Anupam Roy (born 1982), Indian composer and singer
 Anupam Sanklecha (born 1982), Indian cricketer
 Anupam Saraph (born 1961), Indian scientist
 Anupam Sarkar (born 1985), Indian footballer
 Anupam Sharma, Australian film director and actor
 Anupam Shobhakar, musician and composer
 Anupam Shyam (1957–2021), Indian actor
 Anupam Sinha (born 1962), Indian comics writer
 Anupam Sud (born 1944), Indian artist
 Anupam Tripathi, Artist - Korean Cinema

References

Hindu given names
Indian masculine given names